So Amazing: An All-Star Tribute to Luther Vandross is a tribute album to American singer Luther Vandross, released on September 20, 2005, by J Records, nearly three months after Vandross' death. It consists of cover versions of past songs by Vandross, recorded by R&B, soul, and pop artists. The album debuted at number four on the US Billboard 200 and at number one on the US Top R&B/Hip-Hop Albums chart, selling 104,000 copies in its opening week.

Track listing

Notes
  signifies a co-producer
  signifies a vocal producer

Charts

Weekly charts

Year-end charts

Awards and nominations

References

2005 compilation albums
Albums produced by Arif Mardin
Albums produced by Babyface (musician)
Albums produced by Dave Tozer
Albums produced by Jerry Duplessis
Albums produced by Jimmy Jam and Terry Lewis
Albums produced by Raphael Saadiq
Albums produced by the Underdogs (production team)
Albums produced by Wyclef Jean
J Records compilation albums
Luther Vandross tribute albums
Soul compilation albums